Mali Kal is a small settlement in the Municipality of Mirna Peč in southeastern Slovenia. The area is part of the traditional region of Lower Carniola and is now included in the Southeast Slovenia Statistical Region.

References

External links
Mali Kal on Geopedia

Populated places in the Municipality of Mirna Peč